The Tjuvholene Crags are a series of high rock crags measuring at 2,495 m at sea level, which form the northern end of Mount Grytoyr in the Muhlig-Hofmann Mountains of Queen Maud Land. Mapped from surveys and air photos by the Norwegian Antarctic Expedition (1956–60), the formation was named Tjuvholene (the thief's lair).

Cliffs of Queen Maud Land
Princess Martha Coast